There are light-skinned or White Angolans mostly Angolans of European descent most significantly from Portugal. The vast majority of white settlers in Angola have been of Portuguese ancestry, both in colonial days and today. Germans and Afrikaners settled in southern parts of Angola, with Germans concentrated in Moçamedes and Benguela and Afrikaners concentrated in Huíla Province. Most Afrikaners and Germans left for Namibia and South Africa by 1975. Until 1975 there was a German-language school in Benguela called the Deutsche Schule Benguela.

Currently, Whites are a minority ethnic group in Angola, accounting for over 1% of the country's population. The White population usually speaks Portuguese.

History
Portuguese explorer Diogo Cão was the first European to discover Angola.

See also

Portuguese Angolans
German Angolans
Retornados
White South Africans
White Africans
White Namibians
Dorsland Trekkers
History of the Jews in Angola
White people

References and footnotes 

Angola
 
Ethnic groups in Angola